Baby I'm Back is the third solo album of James "J.T." Taylor. The album includes hits "Baby I'm Back" and "Prove My Love". This album was released by MCA Records in 1993.

Track listing

References

External links
 
 Baby I'm Back at Discogs
 Official Website
 Facebook Page
 My Space Page

1993 albums
James "J.T." Taylor albums
MCA Records albums